Khaleda Aktar Kolpona is a Bangladeshi film actress. She also appeared in theater, modeling and drama. She won the Bangladesh National Film Award for Best Supporting Actress for her role in the film The Master of Jinns (1989).

Filmography

Television

Awards

References

External links
 

Living people
Bangladeshi film actresses
Best Supporting Actress National Film Award (Bangladesh) winners
People from Narsingdi District
Year of birth missing (living people)